Whitmill Nunatak is one of the Grossman Nunataks, lying in the west part of the group 5 nautical miles (9 km) south-southwest of Smith Nunataks, in Palmer Land. Mapped by United States Geological Survey (USGS) from surveys and U.S. Navy aerial photographs, 1961–68. Named by Advisory Committee on Antarctic Names (US-ACAN) in 1987 after Leland D. Whitmill, USGS cartographer, a member of the field party on Darwin Glacier and Byrd Glacier, 1978–79.

Nunataks of Palmer Land